Claire Dan AM OBE (1919 or 192022 October 2012) was a Hungarian-Australian actress and philanthropist, best known for founding the Sydney International Piano Competition in 1977.

Biography
Clara Dan was born in Hungary in 1919 or 1920.  She was an actress and cabaret performer, appearing at the National and Vig (Comedy) Theatres in Budapest, both before and after World War II.  Her first husband of only six months was sent to a Soviet labour camp and she never saw him again.  While on a one-woman tour of Romania in 1947 she met another Hungarian, Peter Abeles, then a cabaret entrepreneur, and they married.  They left Hungary for a better life, and lived in Rome, London and Paris before migrating to Australia in 1949.  She was naturalised an Australian citizen in November 1954.

She and Peter Abeles adopted two daughters. After her divorce from Abeles, in 1976 she set up the Cladan Cultural Institute of Australia, a private philanthropic body that acts as the funding body for the Sydney International Piano Competition of Australia (SIPCA).  She founded the competition in association with Rex Hobcroft, the then Director of the Sydney Conservatorium of Music, and with support from the New South Wales Government, then headed by Premier Neville Wran.  SIPCA was first held in 1977 and soon became one of the world's most prestigious classical piano competitions. SIPCA was managed from Claire Dan's home, "Sundorne", 23 Victoria Rd, Bellevue Hill, Sydney.

In 2008 she published an autobiography titled Ups and Downs.

Claire Dan was appointed an Officer of the Order of the British Empire (OBE), and in 1986 a Member of the Order of Australia (AM), in recognition of her service to the performing arts.

She died on 22 October 2012, aged 92.  "Sundorne" was sold for $15.5 million in May 2013, the buyer being the neighbouring Cranbrook School, which had once owned the land.

References

20th-century births
2012 deaths
Australian philanthropists
Founders
Australian patrons of music
Hungarian emigrants to Australia
Naturalised citizens of Australia
Australian Officers of the Order of the British Empire
Members of the Order of Australia
Women founders
Sydney International Piano Competition
20th-century philanthropists